In the 2009–10 season, UD Almería played in two competitions: La Liga and the Copa del Rey. It was their third season in the top flight since promotion from the 2006–07 Segunda División.

Squad
Retrieved on 6 December 2020

Out on loan

Almería B players

Retrieved on 7 December 2020

Transfers

In

Out

Player statistics

Squad stats 
Last updated on 7 December 2020.

|}

Top Scorers
Updated on 11 December 2020

Disciplinary Record
Updated on 30 November 2020

Season Results

La Liga

Results summary

Matches

Copa del Rey

Round of 32

Hércules won 3–1 on aggregate

References

Almeria
UD Almería seasons